The voiceless velar fricative is a type of consonantal sound used in some spoken languages. It was part of the consonant inventory of Old English and can still be found in some dialects of English, most notably in Scottish English, e.g. in loch, broch or saugh (willow).

It is also used in broad transcription instead of the symbol , the Greek chi, for the voiceless uvular fricative.

There is also a voiceless post-velar fricative (also called pre-uvular) in some languages, which can be transcribed as [x̠] or [χ̟]. For voiceless pre-velar fricative (also called post-palatal), see voiceless palatal fricative.

Features

Features of the voiceless velar fricative:

Varieties

Occurrence 
The voiceless velar fricative and its labialized variety are postulated to have occurred in Proto-Germanic, the ancestor of the Germanic languages, as the reflex of the Proto-Indo-European voiceless palatal and velar stops and the labialized voiceless velar stop. This sound change is part of Grimm's law.

In Modern Greek, the voiceless velar fricative (with its allophone the voiceless palatal fricative , occurring before front vowels) originated from the Ancient Greek voiceless aspirated stop  in a sound change that lenited Greek aspirated stops into fricatives.

See also
 Guttural
 Index of phonetics articles

Notes

References

External links
 

Fricative consonants
Velar consonants
Pulmonic consonants
Voiceless oral consonants
Central consonants